Cedar Creek is a  tributary of the James River in the U.S. state of Virginia. It is notable for flowing through the Natural Bridge rock formation, a National Historic Landmark.

Course
The creek rises at the Rockbridge-Botetourt County line near the crest of the Short Hills within the Short Hills Wildlife Management Area, and flows northeast for  along the ridgecrest before dropping off the mountain to the east.  Upon reaching the base of the mountain ridge, Cedar Creek turns south, then southeast, flowing under Interstate 81, then flowing under the Natural Bridge, which carries U.S. Route 11.  The creek continues south  farther, reaching the James River at Gilmore Mills.

Cedar Creek Trail

See also
List of rivers of Virginia

References

Rivers of Virginia
Tributaries of the James River
Rivers of Rockbridge County, Virginia